Monteverdia is a genus of flowering plants in the family Celastraceae.

In a taxonomic review, Leonardo Biral et al. (2017) in Systematic Botany 42 (4), reclassified 123 species of Maytenus now placed in the genus Monteverdia.

Selected species
Some of the 123 species are:
 Monteverdia buxifolia A.Rich., 1845
Monteverdia eggersii (Loes.) Biral, 2017
Monteverdia harrisii (Krug & Urb.) Biral, 2017
Monteverdia laevis (Reissek) Biral, 2017
 Monteverdia macrocarpa (Ruiz & Pav.) Biral, 2017
Monteverdia manabiensis (Loes.) Biral, 2017
Monteverdia matudae (Lundell) Biral, 2017
Monteverdia microcarpa (Fawc. & Rendle) Biral, 2017
Monteverdia multicostata Cornejo & Biral, 2021 
Monteverdia pittieriana (Steyerm.) Biral, 2017
Monteverdia ponceana (Britt.) Biral, 2017
 Monteverdia robusta (Reissek) Biral, 2017
Monteverdia spinosa ((Griseb.) Lourteig & O'Donell) Biral, 2017
Monteverdia stipitata (Lundell) Biral, 2017
Monteverdia zakii Biral & Cornejo, 2021

References

Celastrales genera
Celastraceae